I Got a Rocket is an animated television series centred on a boy named Vincent "Vinnie", who received an anthropomorphic rocket for his birthday. The rocket acts as a best friend to Vinnie and is fond of assisting him. The show is based on the book by Matt Zurbo. The show's run was from 1 December 2006 to 1 February 2007. Although the series was short-lived, it received a 2008 Emmy Award for "New Approaches - Daytime Children's Entertainment".

Characters

Main Characters
Rocket (voiced by Thomas Bromhead): A hyperactive and eccentric rocket  invented for his best friend Vinnie's birthday. Rocket is orange and blue (as in the book by Matt Zurbo), and fiercely relies on assistance, always prepared to assist Vinnie in a situation, although sometimes over-confident in episodes such as "Mackerel Mates". He always says "You Got it, V-Man!" whenever a situation involving Vinnie has occurred.
Vincent Q/Vinnie (voiced by Jamie Oxenbould in Australia, and Thomas Bromhead in the U.S.): An 11-year-old boy who receives Rocket for his birthday. Vinnie converted into a hip, popular boy after the invention of Rocket. Despite his popularity at school, it is a recurring gag in the series that a trio of siblings named The Duckies give him a wedgie, and Vinnie is rather timid when face-to-face with the love of his life, Maya Kovsky.

Other
Professor Quigley Q (voiced by Marcello Fabrizi): Vinnie's father and a genius. It is a recurring gag in the series that he uses scientific words in transitional phrases, including the word "degrees" in the phrase, "I'm proud of you, son!"
Crystal Q (voiced by Rachel King): Vinnie's sister.
Ma Ducky (voiced by Drew Forsythe): The ambitious mother of the bullying triplets known as The Duckys. She is the lunch lady and librarian of Vinnie's school, despises Vinnie and Rocket and ignores her children's bad behaviour.
Biffo Ducky (voiced by Drew Forsythe): The largest, and most muscular of the Duckys.
Scuds Ducky (voiced by Drew Forsythe): The least intelligent of the Duckys.
Frankie Ducky (voiced by Rachel King): The leader and sole female of the Duckys.
VP Stern (voiced by Marcello Fabrizi): The teacher and vice principal of the Inner City School, the school Vinnie, Gabby and Rainbow all study at.
Gabby (voiced by Trilby Glover): A friend of Vinnie.
Rainbow (voiced by Rachel King): Another friend of Vinnie.
Maya Kovsky (voiced by Trilby Glover): Vinnie's love of his life, and also the waiter at Joe's Milk Bar, Vinnie's favourite restaurant.
Captain O'Cheese/Pirate (voiced by Drew Forsythe): A pirate who drives a pirate ship on the streets.

Episodes

Season 1

Broadcast
The show ran on Paramount Global's Network Ten until 2009 in Australia. There were also reruns on ABC3 in 2013. Kabillion aired the show through its VOD service in the United States.

References

2000s American animated television series
2006 American television series debuts
2007 American television series endings
2000s Australian animated television series
2006 Australian television series debuts
2007 Australian television series endings
American children's animated comedy television series
American flash animated television series
American television shows based on children's books
Australian flash animated television series
Australian children's animated comedy television series
Australian television shows based on children's books
Television series by Splash Entertainment
Network 10 original programming